Novorossiya or New Russia ([novoroˈsijɐ]), also referred to as the Union of People's Republics ([soˈjuz nɐˈrodnɪx resˈpublik]) was a project of a confederation of the self-proclaimed Donetsk People's Republic (DPR) and the Luhansk People's Republic (LPR) in Eastern Ukraine, both of which were under the control of pro-Russian separatists at the time.

The concept of "Novorossiya" emerged in public discourse along with the beginning of conflict in east Ukraine. Referring to the historic Novorossiya, a former imperial Russian territory conquered from the Cossacks and the Ottomans in which Russian settlers were encouraged to settle, Russia promoted this New Russia concept as a new identity for the Ukrainian breakaway republics of Donetsk and Luhansk. 

The two constituent republics of the proposed confederation had limited diplomatic recognition, while the Ukrainian government classified them as terrorist groups and initially referred to their territory as the Anti-terrorist Operation Zone. The creation of Novorossiya was declared on 22 May 2014, and one month later spokesmen of both republics declared their merger into a confederal "Union of People's Republics". Within a year, the project was suspended: on 1 January 2015, founding leadership announced the project has been put on hold, and on 20 May the constituent members announced the freezing of the political project.

Background
The historical Novorossiya was a territory of the Russian Empire formed from the Crimean Khanate and the Zaporozhian Sich, which was under a mutual condominium of the Russian Empire and the Polish–Lithuanian Commonwealth. The territory had been annexed several years after the Treaty of Küçük Kaynarca concluded the Russo-Turkish War in 1774. Novorossiya initially included today's Southern Ukraine as well as some parts of today's Russia such as Kuban. The modern Russian Black Sea coast that was occupied by the Russian Tsardom from native Circassians under the military protection of the Ottoman Empire was not conquered until 1829 and was ceded to Russia in the 1829 Treaty of Adrianople.

The Donetsk–Krivoy Rog Soviet Republic was invoked during the war in Donbas (started 2014), when the legislature of the unrecognized separatist Donetsk People's Republic (DPR) adopted a memorandum on 5 February 2015 declaring itself the successor to the Donetsk–Krivoy Rog Soviet Republic, and Artyom as a founding father.

The region was soon colonized by Ukrainian, Romanian, Russian, German, Greek, Bulgarian, Jewish, and other settlers. The major cities were Odesa, Kherson, Mykolaiv, and Novorossiisk (now called Dnipro). In 1802, the governorate of Novorossiya was split into three governorates.

Most of the 18th century Novorossiya was incorporated in 1917 into the newly proclaimed Ukrainian People's Republic. After the defeat of pro-independence Ukrainians in the Ukrainian–Soviet War, the Soviet government confirmed that Southern Ukraine was part of the Ukrainian Soviet Socialist Republic.

The Novorossiya movement made its appearance in Odesa in August 1990. The movement, known as the Democratic Union of Novorossiya, argued that given the separate ethnos of the region it should have an autonomous status within a federated Ukrainian state. It campaigned for "special state status" within "the historical boundaries of Novorossiya" (at the time Odesa, Mykolaiv, Kherson, Dnipropetrovsk, and Crimean Oblasts, and also part of the Dniester region of the Moldavian Soviet Socialist Republic). It failed, however, to gain popular support.

In September 1990, Aleksandr Solzhenitsyn published an article in opposition to the cultural partition of Ukraine and Russia in which he references "Novorossiya", i.e., "including those regions which have never been part of the traditional Ukraine: the 'wild steppe' of the nomads the later 'New Russia' as well as the Crimea, the Donbass area, and the lands stretching east almost to the Caspian Sea". He argues that "self-determination of peoples" requires that a nation must resolve issues of identity for itself.

By November 1991, representatives from the Odesa, Kherson, Mykolaiv, and Crimean Oblasts had met in Odesa to discuss the question of forming a new state, "Novorossiya". This was necessitated, they explained, by the growth of "nationalist tendencies" in Ukraine, its increasing isolationism, and diminishing ties with Russia.Three days after the 1 December 1991 Ukrainian independence referendum, the mayor of St. Petersburg, Anatoly Sobchak, argued that Russia had handed over to Ukraine "a whole series of Russian provinces, the so-called Novorossiya, whose population is for the most part Russian" and that the Russian minority in Ukraine was threatened with forcible "Ukrainianisation". Following the dissolution of the Soviet Union, the term "Novorossiya" began to be used again in calls for the independence or secession of regions of Ukraine corresponding to different areas.

As late as September 1992, in Odesa, several organizations such as the Civic Movement of Odesa, Rus', the Socialist Party, and Novorossiya were campaigning for the establishment of a separate Novorossiyan region, the exact borders of which were still being debated.

In June 1994, the chairman of Transnistria's Supreme Council made a reference to Crimea, Odesa and other oblasts as "Novorossiya". 

After the Orange Revolution, Dmitri Trenin of the Carnegie Moscow Center wrote that in 2005 and again in 2008 some quarters in Moscow, that were not entirely academic, discussed the idea of a Russia-friendly buffer state, "Novorossiya", being formed out of Southern Ukraine from the Crimea to Odesa in response to perceived Western penetration into the former Soviet Union. However, the schema was not encouraged due to perceived waning of the Orange movement.

The idea persisted on the political margins within Ukraine and Russia until resurfaced in spring 2014. As part of Ukrainian-Russian conflict, after successful annexation of Crimea Russia subsequently intervened in eastern Ukraine, exploiting unrest therein agitating and lending support for separatism. In April, after Russian backed separatists seized administration buildings in Donbas the term "Novorossiya" has been brought up often. On 17 April, during talks in Geneva on resolving the crisis, Russian President Vladimir Putin stated at a question and answer session that even "in the tsarist days Kharkov, Lugansk, Donetsk, Kherson, Nikolayev and Odessa were not part of Ukraine" but part of Novorossiya, and that they had been irresponsibly ceded to Ukraine (in fact, the city of Kharkiv and surroundings never belonged to the historical Novorossiya, but to Sloboda Ukraine).

On 29 August 2014, President Putin issued a statement addressed to the "Militia of Novorossiya" calling upon it to show humanitarian compassion and allow surrounded Ukrainian soldiers to withdraw and reunite with their families. This was the last official statement by Putin addressing "Novorossiya".

History

As part of Russia hybrid warfare in Ukraine on 17 April 2014 Russian President Vladimir Putin launched his concept of the historic Novorossiya, giving legitimacy to the nascent separatist movement when he described the Donbas as part of the historic "New Russia" (Novorossiya) region, and issued a statement of bewilderment as how the region had ever become part of Ukraine in 1922 with the foundation of the Ukrainian Soviet Socialist Republic. Few weeks earlier, Putin used similar language when referring to Crimea, which ended with its annexation.

Formation
The New Russia Party, founded on 13 May 2014 in Donetsk, Ukraine, declared on its first congress of 22 May 2014 the formation of a new self-declared state named "Novorossiya", inspired by the historical region of the Russian Empire that carried that name. According to Gubarev the state would include Kharkiv (not part of historical Novorossiya), Kherson, Dnipropetrovsk, Mykolaiv, Odesa, Zaporizhzhia and possibly Sumy (which was later removed from Gubarev's plans). Two days later, the self-appointed "Prime Minister" of Donetsk Alexander Borodai and Luhansk "head of the Republic" Aleksey Karyakin signed a document behind closed doors formalizing their merger into the new confederation. It was also proposed to have Transnistria and Gagauzia join Novorossiya.
In an interview on 31 May, Denis Pushilin, then acting as head of state of the Donetsk People's Republic, stated that Novorossiya currently existed as a union of people's republics, but cooperation could be deepened if more territories were to join. On 24 June, the two separatist republics proclaimed their accession to the union of people's republics, and at the second plenum of the new Parliament of Novorossiya on 15 July, the confederation adopted the official name of Novorossiya. Since the 2 November 2014 Donbas general elections, the Parliament has not gathered again.

Parallel December 2014 declaration
On 12 December 2014, a "Congress of Deputies of All Levels" led by former DPR deputy foreign minister Boris Borisov, alongside figures such as Pavel Gubarev, issued a renewed declaration of the state sovereignty of the "Union of Sovereign Republics" of Novorossiya, claiming it to be an amendment of the 1922 Treaty on the Creation of the USSR. In contrast to the May agreement, the new declaration aimed to build a new executive "from scratch". An official of the DPR responded that although Borisov was well-intentioned, his initiative did not have the material backing necessary for success.

Suspension of the project

On 20 May 2015, supporters of the LNR and the DNR officially announced the freezing of the "New Russia" project and the closure of the related structures of political technology. Oleg Tsaryov, chairman of the movement "New Russia", said that the activities of the Joint Parliament of Novorossiya are frozen because the confederation did not comply with the Minsk II accords. On 11 May 2014, a referendum on self-determination in eight regions (Dnipropetrovsk, Zaporizhzhia, Odesa, Luhansk, Mykolaiv, Kharkiv, Kherson, and Donetsk) was not held as expected, but only in the Luhansk and Donetsk republics. On 24 May 2014, delegates from these eight regions created the Joint Parliament of New Russia; however, this proved to be only virtual as the political structure was unclaimed: the expected delegation of representatives did not occur, leading to the curtailment of the Parliament initiative.

The status of Novorossiya came into dispute on 26 May 2014, when according to Valery Bolotov, "none of the agreements have been concluded" but the intention is to form a "Union of People's Republics". On 1 January 2015, former Donetsk Republic Prime Minister Alexander Borodai, who resigned on 7 August 2014, stated that "there is no Novorossiya" and that the proposed state was a "dream that was not brought to life" and called it a false start. On 8 June 2015, the leaders of the DPR and the LPR submitted their proposed changes to the Constitution of Ukraine that, while calling for wide autonomy of the Donbas region, conceded them as territories of Ukraine. No change was proposed regarding the status of the Autonomous Republic of Crimea as part of Ukraine, considering the status of Crimea outside their purview. This was imputed by news agencies as a recognition by the leaders of the DPR and the LPR of Ukrainian sovereignty over Crimea. Given this interpretation, these changes were withdrawn within hours, and on 15 June 2015, DPR "Prime Minister" Alexander Zakharchenko claimed that the DPR "will never be part of Ukraine".

In mid-June 2015, Igor Girkin said that the situation in Novorossiya was a "colossal failure" no one knew how to patch up and that the plan was to negotiate the return of the autonomous regions of Donetsk and Luhansk to Ukraine in return for Ukraine's de facto acceptance of the annexation of Crimea by the Russian Federation, the gradual withdrawal of sanctions, and the return of all other territories to their previous condition. According to Girkin, should such a "wonderful" plan be realized, Ukraine would become a federal state. "Consequently, in such a manner, a safety catch would be put in place for its entry into NATO. Russia would get leverage over Kyiv in the form of the autonomous regions, and everything would settle down." On 9 June 2016, an anonymous Russian businessman averred that the shooting down of Malaysia Airlines Flight 17 forfeited any chance to create the confederation.

Similar proposal
A project was declared on 18 July 2017 by the Donetsk People's Republic to include all of Ukraine, but the name was changed to "Malorossiya" (Little Russia). The Luhansk People's Republic, however, stated that it would not be taking part in the project. The announcement was widely condemned by nations, including Russia, which pointed to the Minsk agreement.

2022
During the 2022 Russian invasion of Ukraine, Russia occupied a significant portion of the territory that is proposed as "Novorossiya". Some areas of the Mykolaiv, Kherson, Kharkiv, and Zaporizhzhia Oblasts are currently occupied. Russia has created civilian military administrations in the Kherson, Mykolaiv, Kharkiv and Zaporizhzhia Oblasts. From 23–27 September 2022, Russia held annexation referendums in the Donetsk People’s Republic, Luhansk People’s Republic, Kherson Oblast and Zaporizhzhia Oblast regarding accession to the Russian Federation, however the Ukrainian government considers these referendums illegitimate.

Military 

The Armed Forces of Novorossiya were composed of the Donbas People's Militia and the LPR People's Militia (formerly known as the Army of the South-East).

The militias of the Donetsk People's Republic and the Luhansk People's Republic merged into one force on 16 September 2014, forming the "United Armed Forces of Novorossiya".

It is regarded as a terrorist group by the Government of Ukraine and was accused of the downing of a civil aircraft, Malaysia Airlines Flight 17, on 17 July 2014.

International recognition 
No sovereign state of the United Nations has recognized Novorossiya as a sovereign state or political entity. The two constituent republics, the Luhansk People's Republic and the Donetsk People's Republic, are only recognized by three United Nations members, Russia (since 21 February 2022), Syria (since 29 June 2022), North Korea (since 13 July 2022), as well as by the de facto states of South Ossetia (since 2014) and Abkhazia (since 25 February 2022).

Controversy 
Russian dissidents Aleksandr Skobov and Andrey Piontkovsky commented that in its political features (nationalism, imperialism) the entity has similarities to 20th-century fascist movements.

See also
List of active separatist movements in Europe
South-East Ukrainian Autonomous Republic
Occupied territories of Ukraine
Russian irredentism

References

External links

 Official press releases 
 Official website
 Central News Agency Novorossia – Archived

 
2014 establishments in Europe
2015 disestablishments in Europe
Donbas
Former confederations
Former unrecognized countries
History of Donetsk Oblast
History of Luhansk Oblast
Russian nationalism in Ukraine
Russian irredentism
Russian-speaking countries and territories
Russo-Ukrainian War
Separatism in Ukraine
States and territories disestablished in 2015
States and territories established in 2014